Nayden Rusev (born ) is a Bulgarian-Cypriot male former weightlifter, who competed in the 54 kg category and represented Bulgaria at international competitions. He competed at world championships, most recently at the 1997 World Weightlifting Championships., and later for Cyprus in the 2006 Commonwealth Games.

Major results

References

1974 births
Living people
Bulgarian male weightlifters
Place of birth missing (living people)
World Weightlifting Championships medalists
Mediterranean Games bronze medalists for Cyprus
Mediterranean Games medalists in weightlifting
Competitors at the 2005 Mediterranean Games
Weightlifters at the 2006 Commonwealth Games
Commonwealth Games competitors for Cyprus